Marc A. Levin is an American attorney who serves as director of the Center for Effective Justice and the Right on Crime initiative at the Texas Public Policy Foundation in Austin, Texas. An advocate for conservative criminal justice reform, he co-founded Right on Crime in 2010.

Biography

In 1999, Levin graduated with honors from the University of Texas with a B.A. in Plan II Honors and Government.  He was a student columnist for The Daily Texan and in that and other roles was involved in freedom of speech and political controversies as a student.  In 2002, Levin received his J.D. with honors from the University of Texas School of Law.

Levin served as a law clerk to Judge Will Garwood on the U.S. Court of Appeals for the Fifth Circuit and Staff Attorney at the Texas Supreme Court.

Levin then joined the Texas Public Policy Foundation.  He co-founded the Foundation's "influential" Right on Crime think tank in 2010.

Levin was number 25 on Politico's The Politico 50 in 2014.

Mother Jones called Levin "one of the nation's leading advocates of conservative criminal-justice reform."

References

Living people
University of Texas School of Law alumni
Texas lawyers
Year of birth missing (living people)